Harmony in Ultraviolet is the fourth studio album by Canadian electronic music musician Tim Hecker, released on October 16, 2006, on Kranky.

Critical reaction

The album was generally praised by critics, with Pitchfork Media writer Mark Richardson saying "Harmony in Ultraviolet is sensual body music of a very particular kind, and it's the sort of record that asks a lot. But if you trust it and go along, it knows exactly where to lay its hands."

Track listing

Artwork
The album's front cover art is a photograph of a memorial in Bologna, Italy commemorating people from the area who were killed in the Italian resistance movement.

References

External links
Kranky's Harmony in Ultraviolet page

2006 albums
Tim Hecker albums
Kranky albums